Kevin Thomas Hardy (born July 28, 1945 in Oakland, California) is a former professional American football player who was selected by the New Orleans Saints in the first round (7th pick overall) of the 1968 NFL Draft. He was an All-American out of Notre Dame where he also lettered in basketball and baseball.

Hardy played in the National Football League for just 4 seasons and never for the team that drafted him. He appeared in most games during these seasons but was unable to force his way into the starting lineup. He was traded to the San Diego Chargers for a first-round draft pick in 1972.

Hardy is a member of The Pigskin Club Of Washington, D.C. National Intercollegiate All-American Football Players Honor Roll.

References

External links
 Pro-Football-Reference.com

1945 births
Living people
Players of American football from Oakland, California
American football defensive tackles
Notre Dame Fighting Irish football players
Notre Dame Fighting Irish men's basketball players
New Orleans Saints players
San Francisco 49ers players
Green Bay Packers players
San Diego Chargers players
American men's basketball players